What follows is a list of all the athletes that have tested positive for a banned substance either during or before an Asian Games in which they competed. Any medals listed were revoked.

Asian Games

1974 Tehran

1994 Hiroshima

1998 Bangkok

2002 Busan

2006 Doha

2010 Guangzhou

2014 Incheon

2018 Jakarta–Palembang

See also

Doping at the Olympics

References

Asian Games
Asian Games
Asian Games